Psalidodon xiru is a species of fish endemic to the Jacuí River drainage in Brazil. It grows up to 95.7 mm in length.

References

Tetras
Freshwater fish of Brazil
Endemic fauna of Brazil
Fish described in 2013